Miss Grand International 2023 will be the 11th edition of the Miss Grand International pageant, to be held on October 25, 2023 in Ho Chi Minh City, Vietnam. This will be the second time for Vietnam to host the contest; the first was in 2017 at the Vinpearl Convention Center on Phú Quốc island. The winner of Miss Grand International 2022, Isabella Menin of Brazil will crown her successor at the end of the event.

Background

Date and venue
On 25 June 2022, the organizer of the Miss Grand International pageant, MGI PLC, announced on their official social media that the 11th edition of the contest was scheduled to be held in Vietnam on 20 October 2023, however, the final venue of the event has not been revealed yet. The MOU signing ceremony between the MGI PLC and the local organizer Sen Vàng Entertainment for the agreement to organize the contest later took place during the press conference of the inaugural edition of Miss Grand Vietnam contest at Sofitel Saigon plaza in Ho Chi Minh City on 7 June 2022, and the international press release was later conducted at Saigon South Marina Club on 5 July.

As per the press conference additionally held on February 5, 2023, the Miss Grand International 2023 pageant will consist of six main sub-events, including the Best in Swimsuit contest, Vietnamese costume parade, closed-door interview, national costume contest, preliminary competition, and the grand final coronation night. However, the exact date of each event has not been revealed yet.

Sponsorships

Selection of participants

Overview
As of February 2023, six contestants had confirmed their participation, two of whom were determined through the Miss Grand national pageant (A1), including the representatives of Honduras and Venezuela, and the other obtained the Miss Grand national title as a supplementary award at another national contest (B1).

After the conflict with the MGI PLC and the delegitimization of the country's representative in the previous edition, Mauritius was expected to withdraw. Meanwhile, Gibraltar was expected to make its debut and the United Kingdom will instead send representatives to compete on behalf of England, Wales, Scotland, and Northern Ireland.

The information is summarized below.

National preliminary contest
The following is a list of Miss Grand International 2023's national preliminary contests.

Map shows Miss Grand International 2023 participating countries and territories, classified by representative selection methods

Contestants
As of 19 March 2023, 7 contestants will compete for the title:

Upcoming pageants

References

External links 

 Miss Grand International official website

Miss Grand International
October 2023 events in Vietnam
Grand International